Ajax Futebol Clube, commonly referred to as Ajax de Rondônia, or simply Ajax-RO, was a Brazilian professional football club based in Vilhena, Rondônia. Founded in 1982, it last competed in the 2001 Campeonato Rondoniense before folding in 2008 due to continuing financial constraints.

History
The club was founded on 3 February 1982.

Stadium
Ajax Futebol Clube played their home games at Estádio Portal da Amazônia. The stadium has a maximum capacity of 7,000 people.

References

Defunct football clubs in Rondônia
Association football clubs established in 1982
Association football clubs disestablished in 2008
1982 establishments in Brazil
2008 disestablishments in Brazil